The Rudyard Kipling was a British steam trawler launched in 1920 that undertook fishing operations off the coasts of Great Britain and Ireland for almost 20 years. After removing food, equipment, and the crew from the ship, the Germans sunk her with the use of scuttling charges. They eventually landed their lifeboats at Killybegs.

The Rudyard Kipling was the 27th merchant ship, the 26th British merchant ship, and the second British trawler to be sunk by a German U-boat in World War II.

Construction and design
The Rudyard Kipling was constructed in the town of Selby by the shipbuilder Cochrane & Sons Ltd. The trawler was launched from yard number 686 on 11 November 1920. Named the Rudyard Kipling by the ship's owner Newington Steam Trawling Co Ltd., she was registered in the port of Hull on 4 February 1921 and completed later that month. Her official number was 144068. She had a net tonnage of 140 and her gross tonnage was 333. Her engine was a T.3-cylinder from C. D. Holmes & Co Ltd., also of Hull.

Service history

Early service
Following completion and registration, the Rudyard Kipling began fishing off of the coast of Ireland and Great Britain. In May 1934, the trawler was sold to The Sun Steam Trawling Co Ltd. On 10 May, her registry from Hull was closed and on 16 May, she was registered in the English port town of Fleetwood, where her new owners were based. The Rudyard Kipling remained with the Sun Steam Trawling Co Ltd. for the rest of her career.

Sinking
On 16 September 1939, the Rudyard Kipling left Fleetwood for a routine fishing trip to an area off the west coast of Ireland. The German crew then took the Rudyard Kiplings food, including sugar, bread and fish, as well as the trawler's wireless radios, and transferred them over to the U-boat. Timed explosive charges were then placed on the trawler and three minutes later, at 15:53, the trawler exploded and sank.

While raiding the trawler, the Germans took the crew of the Rudyard Kipling on board and provided them with food and warm clothes. Sometime later the crew landed at Killybegs to the west of the town. The Rudyard Kipling was the 27th merchant ship (the 26th one to be British) and the second British trawler to be sunk by a German U-boat in World War II.

References

External links
Steam Trawler Rudyard Kipling Scuttled by U-27 40 miles West of Clare Island Co Mayo 1939
Trawler Tales | Life in Fleetwood 

Ships built in Selby
Steamships of the United Kingdom
1920 ships
Maritime incidents in September 1939
Ships sunk by German submarines in World War II
World War II shipwrecks in the Atlantic Ocean
Shipwrecks of Ireland
Ships sunk with no fatalities